Trevor Halverson (born April 6, 1971) is a Canadian former professional ice hockey forward.

Selected by the Washington Capitals in the 1991 NHL Entry Draft, Halverson failed to make the parent team.  He was claimed by the Mighty Ducks of Anaheim in the 1993 NHL Expansion Draft, but spent his time mainly in the minors.  Halverson returned to the Capitals organization when he signed with them as a free agent in 1998, and finally had the chance to play for the parent team when he played seventeen games during the 1998–99 NHL season.

Halverson was born in White River, Ontario.

Career statistics

External links

1971 births
Canadian ice hockey left wingers
North Bay Centennials players
Baltimore Skipjacks players
Portland Pirates players
Las Vegas Thunder players
Living people
Manitoba Moose (IHL) players
National Hockey League first-round draft picks
Washington Capitals draft picks
Washington Capitals players